Merry-Go-Round is an album by American jazz drummer Elvin Jones recorded in 1971 and released on the Blue Note label.

Reception
The Allmusic review by Scott Yanow awarded the album 3 stars stating "the music is generally quite worthwhile, if a bit eclectic... An interesting set, but Elvin Jones has recorded many more rewarding albums".

Track listing
 "'Round Town" (Gene Perla) - 3:25
 "Brite Piece" (Dave Liebman) - 4:46
 "Lungs" (Jan Hammer) - 2:25
 "A Time for Love" (Johnny Mandel, Paul Francis Webster) - 4:48
 "Tergiversation" (Perla) - 3:27
 "La Fiesta" (Chick Corea) - 6:05
 "The Children's Merry-Go-Round March" (Keiko Jones) - 2:50
 "Who's Afraid..." (Frank Foster) - 4:20

Recorded on February 12 (#8) and December 16 (#1-7), 1971.

Personnel
Elvin Jones - drums, leader
Joe Farrell - soprano saxophone (#2, 6, 8), tenor saxophone (#1), flute (#4), piccolo (#7)
Steve Grossman - soprano saxophone (#2, 7), tenor saxophone (#1, 6)
Dave Liebman - tenor saxophone (#1, 6, 8), soprano saxophone (#2, 6, 7)
Frank Foster - tenor saxophone,  alto clarinet (#8), alto flute,
Pepper Adams - baritone saxophone (#6, 7)
Chick Corea -  piano (#4-6), electric piano (#5)
Jan Hammer - electric piano (#1, 5), piano (#2, 3), glockenspiel (#7)
Yoshiaki Masuo - guitar (#1, 4)
Gene Perla - bass (#2-5), electric bass (#1, 6, 7)
Don Alias - congas (#1, 3, 5, 6), oriental bells (#2)

References

Blue Note Records albums
Elvin Jones albums
1972 albums
Albums recorded at Van Gelder Studio
Albums produced by George Butler (record producer)